Martijn Monteyne (born 12 November 1984) is a Belgian football player who currently plays as a right back for Gullegem in the Belgian Second Amateur Division. He formerly played for Germinal Beerschot and Roda JC Kerkrade, before he returned to Roeselare.

Personal
He is the brother of Pieterjan Monteyne.

External links
 Voetbal International profile 
Weltfussball 
Guardian Football

1984 births
Living people
Belgian footballers
Belgium youth international footballers
Belgium under-21 international footballers
Belgian expatriate footballers
K.S.V. Roeselare players
Beerschot A.C. players
Roda JC Kerkrade players
Belgian Pro League players
Eredivisie players
Eerste Divisie players
Challenger Pro League players
Belgian expatriate sportspeople in the Netherlands
Expatriate footballers in the Netherlands
People from Roeselare
Association football defenders
Footballers from West Flanders